Poland competed at the 2009 World Games in Kaohsiung, Taiwan, from July 16, 2009 to July 26, 2009.

Medalists

Competitors

Air sports
Poland has qualified to the games one man.

Bodybuilding
Poland has qualified to the games one man.

Dancesport
Poland has qualified to the games four pairs. Three of them entered main competition. Pair Kiszka/Garlicka was reserve pair in standard event.

Ju-jitsu
Poland has qualified to the games two men and one woman.

Powerlifting
Poland has qualified to the games four men.

Sport climbing
Poland has qualified to the games one man and one woman.

Sumo
Poland has qualified to the games one man and one woman.

Trampoline gymnastics
Poland has qualified to the games three men.

References 

Nations at the 2009 World Games
2009